Anthony Martin (born 13 February 1995) is an Australian race car driver.

Career
Martin began his racing career in karting in 2008 and continued in karting the following year. In 2013 and 2014 Martin competed in Australian Formula Ford Championship. In 2015 he made his debut in the U.S. F2000 National Championship with John Cummiskey Racing. He returned to the series in 2016, moving to Cape Motorsports with Wayne Taylor Racing and won the championship. He won seven of the sixteen races, along with four other podium finishes and nine poles. The win allows him to climb the Road to Indy ladder and compete in the Pro Mazda Championship in 2017 in which he will continue to compete for Cape Motorsports.

Racing record

Career summary

Motorsports career results

American open–wheel racing results

U.S. F2000 National Championship

Pro Mazda Championship

References

External links
 

 

1995 births
Living people
Australian racing drivers
U.S. F2000 National Championship drivers
Indy Pro 2000 Championship drivers
Atlantic Championship drivers
Wayne Taylor Racing drivers